The 1932 Olympics  may refer to:

The 1932 Winter Olympics, which were held in Lake Placid, United States
The 1932 Summer Olympics, which were held in Los Angeles, United States